Star Cement (formerly known as Cement Manufacturing Company) is a cement manufacturing company in India which is the largest cement manufacturer in Northeast India.

History 
It was founded by Sajjan Bhajanka and Sanjay Agarwal in 2 November 2001 under the name 'Cement Manufacturing Company Limited'. The company is engaged with selling and manufacturing of cements. It's manufacturing plant is located at Khliehriat and Guwahati.  The company has occupied more than 500 to 1,000 hectares of land in Jaintia Hills district. It obtains coal from local market for fuel at the price of 8,000 rupees for 1 tonne. In 14 December 2020, a blast occurred at 8:40 P.M. in which 2 peoples injured. In January 2021, it expanded it's business to East India by making a new plant in West Bengal which worth 4.5 billion. In August 2021, the company approves share buy back proposal. In June 2022, the company invested 17-18 billion rupees for doubling capacity of clinker and adding capacity of 4 million tonne to grinding and donated 10 millions to Assam CM’s Relief Fund. In September 2022, it's stock rises up 5 per cent to 103 per cent.

References 

Cement companies
Cement companies of India
Manufacturing companies of India
Manufacturing companies established in 2001
Indian brands
2001 establishments in India
2001 establishments in Assam
2001 establishments in Meghalaya
Indian companies established in 2001
Companies listed on the National Stock Exchange of India